Chester Heilman Gross (October 13, 1888 – January 9, 1973) was an American politician. He was a Republican member of the United States House of Representatives from Pennsylvania.

Biography
Chester H. Gross was born on a farm in East Manchester Township, York County, Pennsylvania on October 13, 1888. He attended Pennsylvania State College at State College, Pennsylvania.

He served as township supervisor from 1918 to 1922, as a member of the Pennsylvania State House of Representatives in 1929 and 1930, as school board director from 1931 to 1940, and as president of the State School Directors Association in 1939 and 1940.

Gross was elected as a Republican to the Seventy-sixth Congress, but was an unsuccessful candidate for reelection in 1940. 

He returned to farming until he was elected to the Seventy-eighth and to the two succeeding Congresses, but was an unsuccessful candidate for reelection in 1948, defeated by Democrat James F. Lind.    

He was then an unsuccessful candidate for the Republican nomination in 1954 and 1956.  

After his time in Congress he worked as a real estate salesman until his retirement.

Death and interment
He died in York, Pennsylvania on January 9, 1973, and was interred in the Manchester Lutheran Cemetery in Manchester, Pennsylvania.

References

External links

1888 births
1969 deaths
Republican Party members of the Pennsylvania House of Representatives
American Lutherans
Pennsylvania State University alumni
People from York County, Pennsylvania
Republican Party members of the United States House of Representatives from Pennsylvania
20th-century American politicians
20th-century Lutherans